Hucknall Town railway station was a railway station on the Great Northern Railway's Nottingham to Shirebrook line. It served the market town of Hucknall in Nottinghamshire, England.

History

Present day 
No trace of the station remains. The site is now occupied by the annexed petrol station of a supermarket built on the former trackbed.

References

Disused railway stations in Nottinghamshire
Railway stations in Great Britain opened in 1882
Railway stations in Great Britain closed in 1931
Former Great Northern Railway stations
Ashfield District